Sacred Heart Girls' College is a single-sex (girls) secondary and intermediate school in New Plymouth, New Zealand.

Sacred Heart started as a school and boarding facility called Sacred Heart College, founded by the Sisters of Our Lady of the Missions in 1884. The school was next to the present St Joseph's Church and catered for primary & secondary students. In 1960 the school moved to its present site and was renamed Sacred Heart Girls’ College. The boarding hostel for up to 78 boarders, now called "Elizabeth House", was added in 1970. The original school hall was demolished and rebuilt into new rooms for Māori, drama, music and general classrooms, opened in January 2012.

The college, which is under the control of the Mission College New Plymouth Trust Board, became an integrated secondary school, with an attached intermediate school in 1982. Buildings erected since then include the library, staff room and administrative facilities known as the Centennial Wing, a Mathematics block, Religious Studies block and Graphics workshops and a new 5-classroom block (including soft materials technology). The college is situated in grounds which include tennis courts, netball courts and sports field.

The current principal is Barbara Costelloe.

Houses 
Barbier (Blue)
Vianney (Red)
Lourdes (Green)
Chanel (Yellow)

Sources

 Ernest Richard Simmons, Brief history of the Catholic Church in New Zealand, Catholic Publications Centre, Auckland, 1978.
 For the glory of God in New Plymouth : centenary : Sisters of Our Lady of the Missions, New Plymouth-Taranaki-New Zealand, Sisters of Our Lady of the Missions and Centennial Committee, 1985, New Plymouth, 1985. 
 Michael King, God's farthest outpost : a history of Catholics in New Zealand, Viking, Auckland 1997.
 Michael O'Meeghan S.M., Steadfast in hope : the story of the Catholic Archdiocese of Wellington 1850–2000, Dunmore press, Palmerston North, 2003. 

Educational institutions established in 1884
Girls' schools in New Zealand
Schools in New Plymouth
Catholic secondary schools in New Zealand
1884 establishments in New Zealand